A human pathogen is a pathogen (microbe or microorganism such as a virus, bacterium, prion, or fungus)  that causes disease in humans.

The human physiological defense against common pathogens (such as Pneumocystis) is mainly the responsibility of the  immune system with help by some of the body's normal flora and fauna. However, if the immune system or "good" microbiota are damaged in any way (such as by chemotherapy, human immunodeficiency virus (HIV), or antibiotics being taken to kill other pathogens), pathogenic bacteria that were being held at bay can proliferate and cause harm to the host. Such cases are called opportunistic infections.

Some pathogens (such as the bacterium Yersinia pestis, which may have caused the Black Plague, the Variola virus, and the malaria protozoa) have been responsible for massive numbers of casualties and have had numerous effects on affected groups. Of particular note in modern times is HIV, which is known to have infected several million humans globally, along with the influenza virus. Today, while many medical advances have been made to safeguard against infection by pathogens, through the use of vaccination, antibiotics, and fungicide, pathogens continue to threaten human life. Social advances such as food safety, hygiene, and water treatment have reduced the threat from some pathogens.

Types

Viral

Pathogenic viruses are mainly those of the families of: Adenoviridae,  Picornaviridae, Herpesviridae, Hepadnaviridae, Coronaviridae, Flaviviridae, Retroviridae, Orthomyxoviridae, Paramyxoviridae, Papovaviridae, Polyomavirus, Poxviridae, Rhabdoviridae, and Togaviridae. Some notable pathogenic viruses cause smallpox, influenza, mumps, measles, chickenpox, ebola, and rubella. Viruses typically range between 20 and 300 nanometers in length.

This type of pathogen is not cellular, and is instead composed of either RNA (Ribonucleic acid) or DNA (Deoxyribonucleic acid) within a protein shell - the capsid. Pathogenic viruses infiltrate host cells and manipulate the organelles within the cell such as the Ribosomes, Golgi Apparatus, and Endoplasmic Reticulum in order to multiply which commonly results in the death of the host cell via cellular decay. All the viruses that were contained within the lipid bilayer of the cell membrane are then released into the intercellular matrix to infect neighboring cells to continue the viral life cycle.

The white blood cells are responsible for swallowing up the virus using a mechanism known as endocytosis within the extracellular matrix to reduce and fight the infection. The components within the white blood cell are responsible for destroying the virus and recycling it's components for the body to use.

Bacterial

Although the vast majority of bacteria are harmless or beneficial to one's body, a few pathogenic bacteria can cause infectious diseases. The most common bacterial disease is tuberculosis, caused by the bacterium Mycobacterium tuberculosis, which affects  about 2 million people mostly in sub-Saharan Africa. Pathogenic bacteria contribute to other globally important diseases, such as pneumonia, which can be caused by bacteria such as Streptococcus and Pseudomonas, and foodborne illnesses, which can be caused by bacteria such as Shigella, Campylobacter, and Salmonella. Pathogenic bacteria also cause infections such as tetanus, typhoid fever, diphtheria, syphilis, and Hansen's disease. They typically range between 1 and 5 micrometers in length.

Fungal

Fungi are a eukaryotic kingdom of microbes that are usually saprophytes, but can cause diseases in humans. Life-threatening fungal infections in humans most often occur in immunocompromised patients or vulnerable people with a weakened immune system, although fungi are common problems in the immunocompetent population as the causative agents of skin, nail, or yeast infections. Most antibiotics that function on bacterial pathogens cannot be used to treat fungal infections because fungi and their hosts both have eukaryotic cells. Most clinical fungicides belong to the azole group. The typical fungal spore size is 1-40 micrometers in length.

Other parasites

Protozoans are single-celled eukaryotes that feed on microorganisms and organic tissues. Considered as "one-celled animal" as they have animal like behaviors such as motility, predation, and a lack of a cell wall. Many protozoan pathogens are considered human parasites as they cause a variety of diseases such as: malaria, amoebiasis, babesiosis,
giardiasis, toxoplasmosis, cryptosporidiosis, trichomoniasis, Chagas disease, leishmaniasis, African trypanosomiasis (sleeping sickness), Acanthamoeba keratitis, and primary amoebic meningoencephalitis (naegleriasis).

Parasitic worms (Helminths) are macroparasites that can be seen by the naked eye. Worms live and feed in their living host, receiving nourishment and shelter while affecting the host's way of digesting nutrients. They also manipulate the host's immune system by secreting immunomodulatory products which allows them to live in their host for years. Many parasitic worms are more commonly intestinal that are soil-transmitted and infect the digestive tract; other parasitic worms are found in the host's blood vessels. Parasitic worms living in the host can cause weakness and even lead to many diseases. Parasitic worms can cause many diseases to both humans and animals. Helminthiasis (worm infection), Ascariasis, and enterobiasis (pinworm infection) are few that are caused by various parasitic worms.

Prionic

Prions are misfolded proteins that are transmissible and can influence abnormal folding of normal proteins in the brain. They do not contain any DNA or RNA and cannot replicate other than to convert already existing normal proteins to the misfolded state. These abnormally folded proteins are found characteristically in many neurodegenerative diseases as they aggregate the central nervous system and create plaques that damages the tissue structure. This essentially creates "holes" in the tissue. It has been found that prions transmit three ways: obtained, familial, and sporadic. It has also been found that plants play the role of vector for prions. There are eight different diseases that affect mammals that are caused by prions such as scrapie, bovine spongiform encephalopathy (mad cow disease) and Feline spongiform encephalopathy (FSE). There are also ten diseases that affect humans such as, Creutzfeldt–Jakob disease (CJD). and Fatal familial insomnia (FFI).

Animal pathogens
Animal pathogens are disease-causing agents of wild and domestic animal species, at times including humans.

Virulence
Virulence (the tendency of a pathogen to cause damage to a host's fitness) evolves when that pathogen can spread from a diseased host, despite that host being very debilitated.  An example is the malaria parasite, which can spread from a person near death, by hitching a ride to a healthy person on a mosquito that has bitten the diseased person.  This is called horizontal transmission in contrast to vertical transmission, which tends to evolve symbiosis (after a period of high morbidity and mortality in the population) by linking the pathogen's evolutionary success to the evolutionary success of the host organism.

Evolutionary medicine has found that under horizontal transmission, the host population might never develop tolerance to the pathogen.

Transmission

Transmission of pathogens occurs through many different routes, including airborne, direct or indirect contact, sexual contact, through blood, breast milk, or other body fluids, and through the fecal-oral route. One of the primary pathways by which food or water become contaminated is from the release of untreated sewage into a drinking water supply or onto cropland, with the result that people who eat or drink contaminated sources become infected. In developing countries, most sewage is discharged into the environment or on cropland; even in developed countries, some locations have periodic system failures that result in sanitary sewer overflows.

Examples
 Bacillus anthracis — the causative agent of anthrax in humans and animals
 Clostridium botulinum — releases the most powerful neurotoxin leading to death from botulism
 Mycobacterium tuberculosis — the causative agent of most cases of tuberculosis
 Mycobacterium leprae — the bacterium that causes leprosy (Hansen's disease)
 Yersinia pestis — pneumonic, septicemic, and the notorious bubonic plagues (Black Death)
 Rickettsia prowazekii — the etiologic agent of typhus fever
 Bartonella spp.
 Spanish influenza virus
 Entamoeba histolytica virus '' amoeba or amoebiasis

See also 
 Cancer bacteria
 Emerging Pathogens Institute
 Oncovirus
 List of clinically important bacteria
 Lists of diseases
 List of human diseases associated with infectious pathogens
 List of infectious diseases
 List of parasites of humans

References

External links 
 Infectious Disease -- University of Arizona (microvet.arizona.edu)
 Pronunciation Guide to Microorganisms

Microbiology